Bell & Ross is a French watch company based in Paris with manufacturing in La Chaux-de-Fonds, Switzerland. Founded in 1992, the company has specialized in Swiss Made watches for professional users such as divers and pilots.

History and production

Bell & Ross was founded in 1992 as a university project between Bruno Belamich (Bell) and Carlos A. Rosillo (Ross). The company's watches were originally produced by the German company Sinn, but the partnership was dissolved in 2002 soon after Chanel became a minority shareholder, and production was subsequently moved to Switzerland. Starting with its model BR-01 in 2005, the company began producing square watches meant to resemble instruments found in aircraft cockpits, The company's square-cased BR models became its most well-known design. The company divides production among three types of watches: Aviation, Marine and Vintage. The types of watches differ by the size of the case, the movement, and the dial layout.

Associations
In 1992, Bell & Ross started supplying pilot watches to the French air force. The company is the official watch supplier to the Escadron de Chasse 2/4 La Fayette and the French space program.

In 2016, Bell & Ross began working with the Renault Sport Formula 1 Team. This partnership lead to Bell & Ross creating special edition timepieces to signify their relationship with Renault. Bell & Ross remained with Renault as Renault rebranded to Alpine F1 Team and releasing the Alpine F1 Team Watch Collection.

Records
The Bell & Ross Vintage 123 Heure Sautante was the first jumping hour watch with power reserve. It was introduced in 1992.

The Bell & Ross Space 1 was the first automatic chronometer to be worn in space in 1994. 
 
The Bell & Ross Hydromax 11 100 M was the Guinness World Record holder for wristwatch water-resistance at 11,000 meters in 1998.

See also
Baume et Mercier
Breitling SA
Omega SA
TAG Heuer
MB&F
Chanel J12

References

External links

French brands
1992 establishments in Switzerland
Luxury brands
Manufacturing companies established in 1992
Swiss watch brands
Watch manufacturing companies of Switzerland
Chanel